Susan Patterson (born October 11, 1955, in Sun Valley, Idaho) is an American former World Cup alpine ski racer who competed in the 1976 Winter Olympics.  She was fourteenth in the downhill, younger brother Pete (b.1957) was also on the U.S. Olympic team and was thirteenth in the men's downhill.

In 1990, Patterson married explorer Ned Gillette in a ceremony at the Roundhouse on Sun Valley's Bald Mountain. Eight years later, while they were trekking in the mountains of northern Pakistan, Gillette was shot and killed at their encampment; Patterson was hospitalized and recovered.

References

External links
 

1955 births
Living people
American female alpine skiers
Olympic alpine skiers of the United States
Alpine skiers at the 1976 Winter Olympics
People from Sun Valley, Idaho
21st-century American women